Darrell Trent Smith (born September 15, 1979) is a former American football tight end in the National Football League (NFL). He played college football at Oklahoma. He was drafted by the Baltimore Ravens in the 7th round of the 2003 NFL Draft. He also played for the San Francisco 49ers.

Smith currently owns Sooner Medical Staffing, Sooner Technologies, and Corinthian Investments all based out of Oklahoma City.

External links
Player Profile

1979 births
Living people
American football tight ends
Baltimore Ravens players
Cologne Centurions (NFL Europe) players
Oklahoma Sooners football players
Players of American football from Oklahoma
San Francisco 49ers players
Sportspeople from Norman, Oklahoma
Sportspeople from Oklahoma City